Kevin Clarke  (9 February 1932 – 5 November 1993) was an Australian rules footballer who played with Collingwood in the Victorian Football League (VFL).

Notes

External links 

Profile at Collingwood Forever

1932 births
1993 deaths
Australian rules footballers from Victoria (Australia)
Collingwood Football Club players
Ivanhoe Amateurs Football Club players